Ceratopeltis is an extinct genus from a well-known class of fossil marine arthropods, the trilobites. It lived during the Arenig stage of the Ordovician Period, approximately 478 to 471 million years ago.

References

Early Ordovician trilobites of Europe
Fossils of Greenland
Paleozoic life of Nunavut
Proetida genera